Kevin Lawrence Bradley (27 October 1931 – 8 February 2013) was an Australian rules footballer who played with Essendon and Richmond in the Victorian Football League (VFL).

Notes

External links 		
		
		
Profile at Tigerland Archive		
Profile at WAFL Footy Facts
		
		
		
1931 births		
2013 deaths
Australian rules footballers from Western Australia
Essendon Football Club players		
Richmond Football Club players
West Perth Football Club players